Claudio Benoît Beauvue (born 16 April 1988) is a Guadeloupean professional footballer who plays for Championnat National 2 club Boulogne. Mainly a left winger, he can also play as a forward.

Club career

Troyes
Beauvue joined Troyes from Nantes' academy in 2006. He made his professional debut on 24 August 2007 against Bastia in the 2007–08 Ligue 2 season. He signed his first professional contract with the club in the summer of 2008.

Chateauroux
On 23 March 2011, Beauvue was loaned (with an option to make deal permanent) for the 2011–12 Ligue 2 season to Châteauroux. He made his first start against Guingamp and scored 10 goals in 37 matches during the Ligue 2 campaign, with Châteauroux exercising their option to make the loan deal permanent.

On 19 October 2012, during the 2012–13 season, Beauvue scored a hat-trick in a Ligue 2 match against Gazélec Ajaccio (3–1).

Bastia
On 29 January 2013, Beauvue was loaned – with an option to buy – to Ligue 1 side Bastia. He made his first start for the Corsican side against Evian and scored his first and only goal for the side during the 36th matchday of the 2012–13 Ligue 1 season against Montpellier. At the end of the season, Bastia did not opt to purchase Beauvue.

Guingamp
On 30 June 2013, Beauvue signed for Guingamp. During his first season, he lifted the Coupe de France with his team after they beat Rennes 2–0 at the Stade de France.

During the next season, Beauvue became a regular starter for the side during its Ligue 1 and UEFA Europa League campaign. He scored five goals in the Europa League – one against Fiorentina, one against Dinamo Minsk, two against PAOK and one against Dynamo Kyiv – in a campaign in which Guingamp were able to qualify for the round of 16 of the Europa League for the first team in club history.

Beauvue finished the season with 22 goals in 46 games that season, fifth-most in Ligue 1 behind Alexandre Lacazette, André-Pierre Gignac, Zlatan Ibrahimović and Edinson Cavani.

Lyon
On 27 June 2015, Beauvue joined Lyon on a four-year contract. The transfer fee was estimated at €4.5 million, with €3 million bonus. He played his first match with the side against Paris Saint-Germain, a 2–0 loss in the Trophée des Champions played in Montreal. He scored his first goal with the club in a 1–0 win against former club Guingamp at the Stade du Roudourou. He did not celebrate the goal, however, and opted to spend the night at the Panier des Salades, a bar frequented by Guingamp fans.

Despite his numerous first-team starts, Beauvue failed to fit in with the Lyon style of play, which is more focused on passing and possession. He scored his last goal for the club against another former side, Troyes.

Celta
On 16 January 2016, during the winter transfer window, Beauvue joined Spanish La Liga side Celta on a €5 million transfer fee, along with a €2.5 million bonus. He signed a five-year contract.

Leganés (loan)
On 29 August 2017, Beauvue was loaned to fellow top tier club Leganés, for one season.

Caen (loan)
On 30 August 2018, Beauvue joined Caen on loan for the 2018–19 season. Caen secured an option to sign him permanently.

Deportivo La Coruña
On 18 January 2020, Beauvue signed a 18-month contract with Deportivo La Coruña. He scored two goals in their final match of the season against Fuenlabrada (2-1). This game was postponed from the final matchday on 20 July. Beauvue (who was on holiday) travelled from the other side of the world to A Coruña for playing the match on 7 August as it was rescheduled very late. Despite the relegation of Deportivo to the Segunda B the striker decided to stay at the club.

Boulogne
In August 2021, Beauvue signed with Boulogne in the Championnat National, the third tier of French football.

International career
Beauvue was born in Guadeloupe and moved to France at a young age. He was called up to the Guadeloupe national team in 2008 and scored his first goal for them in 2016, against Suriname.

Career statistics

Club

International
Scores and results list Guadeloupe's goal tally first, score column indicates score after each Beauvue goal.

Honours
Guingamp
 Coupe de France: 2013–14

References

External links

 
 

1988 births
Living people
People from Saint-Claude, Guadeloupe
French footballers
Guadeloupean footballers
Guadeloupe international footballers
Association football wingers
Association football forwards
ES Troyes AC players
LB Châteauroux players
SC Bastia players
En Avant Guingamp players
Olympique Lyonnais players
RC Celta de Vigo players
CD Leganés players
Deportivo de La Coruña players
Stade Malherbe Caen players
US Boulogne players
Ligue 2 players
Championnat National players
Ligue 1 players
La Liga players
Segunda División players
French expatriate footballers
Guadeloupean expatriate footballers
Expatriate footballers in Spain
French expatriate sportspeople in Spain
French people of Guadeloupean descent